is a Quasi-National Park that spans areas of Tottori Prefecture, Shimane Prefecture, and Hiroshima Prefecture, to the east of the island of Honshu, Japan. As its name suggests, the Hiba-Dogo-Taishaku Quasi-National Park is composed of a series of mountains and ravines in the middle of the Chūgoku Mountains. The park has virgin forests of Japanese beeches, Japanese oaks, Japanese horse-chestnuts and interesting ferns. Fauna include the Asiatic black bear, Japanese macaque, mountain hawk eagle and the Japanese giant salamander. Lake Shinryū is also a component of the park.

Mountains

Noted mountains of the Hiba-Dogo-Taishaku Quasi-National Park are Mount Hiba, Mount Azuma, Mount Sentsū, and Mount Dōgo. According to the Kojiki, Mount Sentsū is noted for its association with the Susanoo myth, specifically his battle with Yamata no Orochi.

Taishaku Ravine

The scenic  in Hiroshima Prefecture, an important part of the park, is formed by erosion caused by the Taishaku River.

Recreation

Hiba-Dogo-Taishaku Quasi-National Park is a popular destination for hiking and skiing.

See also

List of national parks of Japan

References

External links
Ministry of the Environment

National parks of Japan
Parks and gardens in Hiroshima Prefecture
Parks and gardens in Shimane Prefecture
Parks and gardens in Tottori Prefecture
Geography of Hiroshima Prefecture
Geography of Shimane Prefecture
Geography of Tottori Prefecture
Tourist attractions in Hiroshima Prefecture
Tourist attractions in Shimane Prefecture
Tourist attractions in Tottori Prefecture
Protected areas established in 1963